John-James Ford (born 1972) is a Canadian poet and fiction writer.

Born in Kindersley, Saskatchewan, Ford studied at the Royal Military College of Canada in Kingston, Ontario and at the University of New Brunswick in Fredericton, New Brunswick.

His poetry and short fiction have been published in Grey Borders, Papertiger, qwerty, Carousel, Prairie Fire, stonestone, Veritas, and sub-Terrain. His first novel, Bonk on the Head (2005), was published by Nightwood Editions. Ford won the 2006 Ottawa Book Award in the English fiction category (tied with The Sundog Season by John Geddes).

External links
Nightwood Editions
Bonk on the Head
Writer's Union profile
Records of Nightwood Editions are held by Simon Fraser University's Special Collections and Rare Books

1972 births
Canadian male novelists
Living people
Royal Military College of Canada alumni
Date of birth missing (living people)
People from Kindersley